Antonín Novotný (22 August 1827 in Dobromilice – 9 March 1871) was a Czech chess composer and lawyer in Brno. The Novotny theme is named after himthe first appearance of the theme was in a Novotný three-mover from 1854.

Solution:

1.Rf5! threatens 2.Rf4 mate.  If 1... Bxf5 then 2.Nf7 threatens both mate with either 3.Nd6# and N7g5# which can't be stopped.

1...Rf8 2.Bf6! Blocks both f8-f4 and g7-e5 lines and threats 3.Rf4# and 3.Re5#

2...Rxf6 3.Re5#, 2...Bxf6 3.Rf4#, 2...Bxf5 3.Ng5# or 3.Nd2#

References

External links
 Chess Problem Database - Anton Nowotny

Chess composers
Czech chess players
1827 births
1871 deaths
People from Prostějov District
19th-century chess players